UPIC may refer to:

 UPIC, computerised musical composition tool 
 Universal Payment Identification Code
 Universal Programming Interface for Communication
 University Presidential Inaugural Conference

See also 
 Yupik (disambiguation)